Marilyn Monroe wore a shocking pink dress in the 1953 film Gentlemen Prefer Blondes, directed by Howard Hawks. The dress was created by costume designer William "Billy" Travilla and was used in one of the most famous scenes of the film, which subsequently became the subject of numerous imitations, significantly from Madonna in the music video for her 1985 song "Material Girl".

History

When the costume designer William Travilla, known simply as Travilla, began working with Marilyn Monroe, he had already won an Oscar for his work in Adventures of Don Juan in 1948. Travilla designed the clothes of the actress in eight films, and later claimed to have had a brief affair with Monroe. In 1953 Travilla designed the costumes for Gentlemen Prefer Blondes.

Originally, Monroe was to wear a breathtaking show girl costume, costing close to $4,000 (1953 dollars). It had jewels sewn onto a black fish-net bodystocking up to the breasts, then covered in nude fabric, embellished with a mass of diamonds.

During production, it became public knowledge that Monroe had posed nude for a calendar in 1949, before she became well known. Travilla was given strict instructions to design a new, less-revealing costume in order to distance Monroe from the scandal. He designed the pink dress as a last-minute replacement.

The pink dress was worn by Monroe in the role of Lorelei Lee in the famous sequence in which the actress sings the song 
"Diamonds Are a Girl's Best Friend", the choreography accompanied by several suitors in dinner clothes.  Travilla's notes reveal that Monroe wore two identical copies in the scene as it took a long time to shoot and the dress, being floor length, was very prone to getting dirt on it.

The only pink dress known to survive was auctioned at Profiles in History on 11 June 2010, with an estimated price of between $150,000 and $250,000 and described as "the most important film costume to ever come to auction". The dress ultimately sold for $370,000. It was described in the auction catalog as follows:
This Travilla-designed pink silk satin strapless gown features black satin lining on the oversized bow attached at back. Features integral brassier with rear zipper closure (concealed with bow overlay) and interior Fox cleaning tag. Also comes with the original pair of screen-worn opera-length tubes worn over Marilyn’s arms (gloves are shown for display only) and pink satin belt with "M. Monroe A-698 1-27-3-7953" written on the inner leather lining. Originally designed to be a two-piece garment, this lot features an additional bonus having the original top made for this dress (featuring interior bias label handwritten "1-27-3-7971 M. Monroe A 698-74") that was not used in the production. This design was discarded due to the top and skirt separating when Marilyn raised her arms during the number. The gown exhibits slight toning in areas, common in silk garments from this era; otherwise in fine condition. The leather backing on the belt is cracked and missing in areas and silk exhibits fraying on edges.

Marilyn Monroe wore a white version of this dress (without the bow) to the premiere of her film There's No Business Like Show Business (1954). She was photographed extensively wearing this dress with a white fur stole and with a pair of matching opera gloves.

Design

The dress is constructed of shocking pink peau d'ange silk fabric, lined with black silk/satin, and was designed by William Travilla. The floor-length gown is strapless and features a straight neckline. The scene that features the dress is heavily choreographed, so a slit in the back of the dress was added to allow for movement. The dress also has a large "bow" on the back, which is part of the dress construction, not added on as a separate piece. The bow is lined with black satin and is pleated in back on one side of the gown and folded over and attached to the other section.

The outfit also features two-tone opera gloves. The gloves were mostly made of the same shocking pink peau d'ange fabric, whereas the palm section of was made of a lighter shade of pink suede.

The jewels Monroe wore were costume and not authentic diamonds.

Impact on popular culture

Over the years the pink dress has become an icon of fashion and film, and like her white dress is often imitated and parodied. One of the most famous of all is the one represented by the singer Madonna in the music video for her 1985 hit "Material Girl".

In a segment entitled "Material Girl" in the 1997 Playboy Video, Playboy's Voluptuous Vixens, SaRenna Lee capitalized on her resemblance to Marilyn Monroe by appearing in a pink dress designed for her zaftig shape.

Mexican entertainers Thalía and Aida Pierce each wore similar shocking pink dresses.  Thalia wore a replica of this dress while performing "Diamonds are a Girl's Best Friend" in Spain in 1991, and Pierce wore a similar pink dress in a 2001 episode of Humor es...los comediantes as a tribute to Monroe (2001 would have been Monroe's 75th birthday).

American singer Normani wore a leotard with a skirt inspired by this dress in her music video for "Diamonds" (The song itself sampling "Diamonds Are a Girl's Best Friend" by Monroe).

In the computer game The Sims: Superstar expansion pack published in 2003, the player can see the character of Marilyn Monroe, dressed in the same famous shocking pink dress. It was also produced as a Mattel Barbie doll with Barbie wearing Monroe's pink dress.

In the third episode of the second season of the American television series Crazy Ex-Girlfriend, Rachel Bloom as Rebecca Bunch wears a blue version of the dress while singing "The Math of Love Triangles." Parodying Monroe's performance of "Diamonds Are A Girl's Best Friend" 

In the thirteenth episode of the fifth season of the popular teen drama Gossip Girl, main character Serena Van Der Woodsen (portrayed by Blake Lively)  is seen dreaming she is in Monroe's pink dress, replicating the dance and song with her male suitors on the show.

The 2020 film Birds of Prey contains a scene referencing "Diamonds Are A Girl's Best Friend." Lead character Harley Quinn goes into a dream/dissociation sequence wearing an outfit of the same pink style and jewels just like Monroe's character in the film as the song plays in the background. This may also be in reference to the use of the Diamonds song in Moulin Rouge! since actor Ewan McGregor appears in both scenes.

See also 

 White dress of Marilyn Monroe
 Black dress of Rita Hayworth
 Black Givenchy dress of Audrey Hepburn
 List of film memorabilia
 List of individual dresses

References

1953 clothing
Dresses in film
Film memorabilia
Pink dress
Marilyn Monroe